Herbert Elbert Rhéaume (January 12, 1900 – January 1, 1953) was a Canadian professional ice hockey goaltender who played 31 games in the National Hockey League for the Montreal Canadiens as an emergency replacement following Georges Vézina's death during the 1925–26 season. The following year, he was replaced by George Hainsworth in the Habs' net. Rhéaume was born in Masson, Quebec but grew up in Ottawa, Ontario.

External links

1900 births
1953 deaths
Canadian ice hockey goaltenders
Ice hockey people from Ottawa
Ice hockey people from Gatineau
Montreal Canadiens players
St. Louis Flyers (AHA) players
Westminster Hockey Club ice hockey players